Atomic Cartoons is a Canadian animation studio founded in 1999 by Trevor Bentley, Mauro Casalese, Olaf Miller, and Rob Davies. Based out of Vancouver, British Columbia, it produces service animation for a wide variety of clients, as well as creating its own properties. Since 2015, the company has been owned by Thunderbird Entertainment.

History 
The studio was founded in March 1999 by Trevor Bentley, Mauro Casalese, Olaf Miller, and Rob Davies. Sent back to Vancouver, British Columbia, after losing his job at Warner Bros. Animation following the cancellation of Pinky, Elmyra & the Brain, Davies received a phone call from Sunwoo Entertainment's Jae Moh to help produce . Together with Miller, Bentley, and Casalese, the four launched Atomic Cartoons to assist in creating the series.

Between 2004 and 2008, the company produced Atomic Betty for Teletoon in association with Breakthrough Entertainment and Tele Images Kids. Atomic's first fully original creation, the show's titular heroine served as the studio's mascot for a number of years.

In 2010, Miller left to launch his own studio. The following year, Jennifer McCarron was appointed head of production. On July 8, 2015, Atomic Cartoons was acquired by Canadian production company Thunderbird Films. The three founders remain on board. McCarron was named president and chief executive officer in 2016.

In December 2018, the company opened a second animation studio in Ottawa, Ontario. Its first project was the Netflix series The Last Kids on Earth.

In February 2020, Atomic Cartoons opened its third studio in Los Angeles, California.

Productions

Shows

Films/specials

Other
 The Oblongs (2001; Layout)
 Chub City (2014; scrapped project)
 Five Alarm Funk 'Robot''' (2015, music video)
 Vindicators 2 (2022, 10 episodes, short spin-off of Rick and Morty'')

References

External links 
 

Canadian companies established in 1999
Mass media companies established in 1999
Canadian animation studios
1999 establishments in British Columbia
Companies based in Vancouver
2015 mergers and acquisitions